Tom English (born 17 November 1981) is an English former professional footballer who played as a forward for Arsenal where he was a member of the FA youth cup winning squad in 2000 and Marine Castle United (today Hougang United) in the Singaporean S.League in 2001. His professional career was cut short after he was seriously injured in a fall in Tenerife, though he eventually played semi-professionally for several East Anglian sides. He now works as a postman.

Career
The son of former Coventry City, Leicester City and Colchester United striker Tommy English, Tom English was initially on the books of Norwich City, joining Arsenal in the summer of 1998 but making no first team appearances before being released in the summer of 2000.

After a short spell playing alongside his father at Harwich & Parkeston, in January 2001 he signed for Marine Castle United (today Hougang United) in the Singaporean S.League, where he scored fifteen goals in the 2001 season. With a move to  QPR in prospect, he returned to Europe but during a holiday trip to Tenerife suffered a fall that severely damaged his right knee, alongside a broken jaw, facial injuries and a head injury that put him in a coma for ten days.

Unable to resume a professional career, he played for English clubs Stanway Rovers, Hendon, Harwich & Parkeston, A.F.C. Sudbury, Mildenhall Town, Haverhill Rovers, Tiptree United, Ipswich Wanderers, Halstead Town, and Heybridge Swifts before retiring in 2011. He now works as a postman.

References

External links 
As English as they come (only accessible through NLB)

1981 births
Living people
Footballers from Coventry
English footballers
Harwich & Parkeston F.C. players
Hougang United FC players
Stanway Rovers F.C. players
Hendon F.C. players
A.F.C. Sudbury players
Mildenhall Town F.C. players
Haverhill Rovers F.C. players
Tiptree United F.C. players
Ipswich Wanderers F.C. players
Halstead Town F.C. players
Heybridge Swifts F.C. players
Association football forwards